Lavínia Gutmann Vlasak (born 14 June 1976) is a Brazilian actress and former model.

Biography 
Vlasak was born in Rio de Janeiro, daughter of Chief Financial Officer Robert Vlasak and homemaker Eugênia Gutmann. The surname Vlasak is of Czech origin. It came from her paternal grandfather who, however, was born in Austria. In addition, Lavínia has German ancestry from both father and mother.

In 1980, she moved to the United States when her father, who worked for a multinational corporation, was transferred there. She lived outside of Brazil from 4 to 7 years of age and therefore was literate in English. After only seven years, on her return to Brazil, she learned Portuguese. When Vlasak returned, she studied at the British School in Rio de Janeiro. The school's curriculum could focus on art education, where he became interested in acting profession. Early on, listened to their teachers that would be an excellent performer.

Career 
She began his professional life working as a model. Her career began as pure imposition of the father, who impressed with a few pictures of her daughter, then 15, required to make a book. Lavinia has still tried to argue in vain, saying that actually wanted to do journalism, because it both had studied to be only a model but had no other alternative. After that, never stopped, and went with the money that funded this craft their courses as an actress.

At 16, she married her first boyfriend, actor Jorge Pontual, and were together for five years. He studied acting at the House of Art of the orange and also made the Actors Workshop of Rede Globo. It was during the workshop that received an invitation from director Luiz Fernando Carvalho to test for the novel O Rei do Gado.

In 1999, shone on the small screen to be honored with his first villain in the novel Força de um Desejo. In the plot, lived the perfidious Alice Ventura, daughter of the unscrupulous Higino Ventura dazzled Barbara Ventura, who dreams of becoming a noble. Nourishes an overwhelming passion by Inácio Sobral, but this only has eyes for the former courtesan Ester Delamare. In an attempt to arrest him, gets pregnant and Abelardo says that the child is her husband. Only he did not expect was to discover that Abelard, is actually his brother by his father.

After 10 years of career changed by Rede Globo, Rede Record and won his first girl in the novels. Owner of a solid career in the old house, where he had the opportunity to live such different roles, completed a decade-long career in full transformation.

After motherhood, limited only to guest appearances on shows. After five years, in 2010, returned to the Globo in episodes of the series A Vida Alheia and As Cariocas. In 2011, he made a cameo in Insensato Coração. In 2012 he participated in the episode "A Culpada de BH" of series As Brasileiras.

Lavínia returned to TV in 2015, at the invitation of director Luiz Henrique Rios, to play former model Natasha in the novel Totalmente Demais.

Personal life
In 1992, at the age of 16, she went to live with her first boyfriend, the actor Jorge Pontual. They had been together since their 14 years of age, and their union was against the will of their parents, who thought it too young to marry. The marital union lasted five years, and in 1997 they separated amicably.

She is married to economist Celso Colombo Neto, who has a son, Felipe, born December 27, 2008 and Estela, born February 22, 2012. Her two children were born cesarean at the Casa de Saúde São José in Humaitá, Rio de Janeiro.

Filmography

Television

Film

References

External links

1976 births
Living people
Actresses from Rio de Janeiro (city)
Brazilian people of Czech descent
Brazilian people of German descent
Brazilian telenovela actresses
Brazilian film actresses
20th-century Brazilian actresses
21st-century Brazilian actresses
Brazilian people of Austrian descent